The 2022 Veterans World Wrestling Championships was held from 4 to 9 October 2022 in Plovdiv, Bulgaria.

The competition will be held in the following age categories:
 Division " A " 35 – 40 years
 Division " B " 41 – 45 years
 Division " C " 46 – 50 years
 Division " D " 51 – 55 years
 Division " E " 56 – 60 years
 
The weight categories are as follows:
55 – 62 kg 
70 kg 
78 kg 
88 kg 
100 kg 
100 – 130 kg

Medal table

Medal summary

Men's freestyle

Veterans A

Veterans B

Veterans C

Veterans D

Veterans E

Men's Greco-Roman

Veterans A

Veterans B

Veterans C

Veterans D

Veterans E

References

External links
 Official website
 Results book
 Final book

Veterans World Wrestling Championships
International wrestling competitions hosted by Bulgaria
Sport in Bulgaria